Anjunabeats Volume Six is the sixth album in the Anjunabeats Volume compilation series mixed and compiled by British trance group Above & Beyond released on 6 October 2008.

The digital download version was released on 6 April 2009 and contains the individual songs listed.

Track listing

References

External links

2008 compilation albums
Above & Beyond (band) albums
Anjunabeats compilation albums
Sequel albums
Electronic compilation albums